The Armenian national basketball team (Hayastani basketboli azgayin havak'akan) is the national basketball team representing Armenia. The national team is directed by the Basketball Federation of Armenia. Since 2006, the President of the federation is Hrachya Rostomyan.

History 
In December 2015, it was announced that the men's national team would play in its first official tournament ever in Summer 2016, after joining the 2016 FIBA European Championship for Small Countries. The team won the tournament by beating Moldova national basketball team in the gold medal game 79–71.

Armenia's debut in major competition was in the 2019 World Cup qualification, where despite achieving three wins in six matches, it was eliminated in the first round. In 2018, after qualifying to the EuroBasket 2021 second round of the pre-qualifiers, the team withdrew due to financial constraint.

Armenia will come back to the competition in 2020, to play in the European Championship for Small Countries.

Competitive record

Current roster

See also

Armenia women's national basketball team
Armenia national under-19 basketball team
Armenia national under-17 basketball team
Sport in Armenia

References

External links
Armenia Basketball Records at FIBA Archive
Presentation on Eurobasket.com
Armenia Basketball Federation Presentation on Facebook

1991 establishments in Armenia
Armenia
Armenia national basketball team